Gaiety George is a 1946 British historical musical film directed by George King and Leontine Sagan and starring Richard Greene, Ann Todd and Peter Graves. It is set in the late Victorian music hall, when an Irish impresario arrives in London.

The film was inspired by the memory of George Edwardes.

Cast
 Richard Greene as George Howard 
 Ann Todd as Katharine Davis 
 Peter Graves as Henry Carter 
 Morland Graham as Morris 
 Hazel Court as Elizabeth Brown 
 Charles Victor as Danny Collier 
 Jack Train as Hastings  
 Leni Lynn as Florence Stevens  
 Ursula Jeans as Isobel Forbes  
 Daphne Barker as Miss de Courtney  
 Maire O'Neill as Mrs. Murphy  
 Frank Pettingell as Grindley  
 Phyllis Robins as Chubbs  
 John Laurie as McTavish  
 Frederick Burtwell as Jenkins 
 Anthony Holles as Wade  
 David Horne as Lord Mountsbury  
 Patrick Waddington as Lt. Travers  
 Claud Allister as Archie  
 Graeme Muir as Lord Elstown  
 Evelyn Darvell as Maisie  
 Paul Blake as Lord Royville  
 John Miller as Rosie  
 Richard Molinas as Laurient  
 Gerhard Kempinski as Muller  
 Wally Patch as Commissionaire 
 Carl Jaffe as Kommandant 
 Everley Gregg as Landlady 
 Roger Moore as Member of the Audience  
 Hugh Morton as King (on stage)  
 Maxwell Reed as Prince (on stage)

References

Bibliography
 Harper, Sue. Picturing the Past: The Rise and Fall of the British Costume Film. British Film Institute, 1994.
 Murphy, Robert. Realism and Tinsel: Cinema and Society in Britain, 1939–1949. Routledge, 1989.

External links

Review of film at Variety

1946 films
British historical musical films
British black-and-white films
1940s historical musical films
Films directed by George King
Films set in London
Films set in the 19th century
Films scored by Jack Beaver
Films set in the Victorian era
1940s English-language films
1940s British films